Saint Philip's in the Hills Episcopal Church is a historic church at 4440 N. Campbell Avenue in Tucson, Arizona, United States.  It was built in 1936 and added to the National Register of Historic Places in 2004. John and Helen Murphey, residents of Tucson, initially sought to commission architect Josias Joesler to construct a private chapel for them at their home. Joesler convinced them to fund the construction of a church at the intersection of Campbell Avenue and River Road in a then-undeveloped area of Tucson. The church's first rector was Fr. George Ferguson.

See also
 Casa Juan Paisano, home of John and Helen Murphy, also National Register-listed

References

External links

 

Churches in Tucson, Arizona
Episcopal church buildings in Arizona
Mission Revival architecture in Arizona
Churches on the National Register of Historic Places in Arizona
Churches completed in 1936
Churches in Pima County, Arizona
National Register of Historic Places in Tucson, Arizona